Bayfront Health St. Petersburg is a 480-bed tertiary care center equipped to provide comprehensive medical and surgical care. The hospital offers many areas of expertise, including surgery and trauma, neuroscience, cardiology, acute rehabilitation and obstetrics. The hospital has a 38-bed neurosciences unit with a dedicated neurology team consisting of board-certified neuroscience specialists and physicians with subspecialty expertise in stroke, epilepsy and Parkinson's disease, and includes a Level IV Epilepsy Center. Bayfront Health Baby Place offers full obstetrical services.

Bayfront Health St. Petersburg, formerly known as Bayfront Medical Center, is an Orlando Health wholly owned hospital in St. Petersburg, Florida. Bayfront Health-St. Petersburg is Pinellas County's only trauma center and St. Petersburg's longest-standing hospital.

Bayfront is a not-for-profit teaching hospital that provides comprehensive services in trauma and emergency care; orthopaedics; obstetrics and gynecology; cardiac medicine and surgery (specializing in valve surgery); neurosciences (with its own epilepsy center); sports medicine; surgery and rehabilitation. More than 550 physicians are on staff with specialties ranging from open-heart surgery to fertility treatment.

It is also home to Bayflite, an air medical helicopter transport program. Bayflite, the largest hospital-based flight program in the Southeastern United States, was started more than two decades ago and the first flight program in Florida that carried lifesaving blood on every flight.

Bayfront is nationally accredited by the Joint Commission and also maintains the following accreditations and certifications: Level II Trauma Center, Level III Regional Perinatal Intensive Care Center, Primary Stroke Center, Chest Pain Center and  Hip & Knee Replacement.

Bayfront was originally organized as the St. Petersburg Sanitarium in 1906, and over the next six decades re-designated as the Good Samaritan Hospital, Augusta Memorial Hospital, City Hospital, Mound Park Hospital, Bayfront Medical Center, and finally in 2013, Bayfront Health St. Petersburg. It was the first hospital in the city to integrate. The first African-American patient, Altamese Chapman, was a longtime Bayfront volunteer.

Bayfront, in its Mound Park Hospital form, was mentioned in the Ian Fleming 007 novel "Live and Let Die".

In October 2012, plans were announced to merge Bayfront Medical Center with Health Management Associates and Shands HealthCare. The merger transformed Bayfront Medical Center into a for-profit facility and created a new integrated care delivery network with six other HMA hospitals, including Brooksville Regional Hospital, Spring Hill Regional Hospital, Venice Regional Medical Center, Charlotte Regional Medical Center, Peace River Regional Medical Center, and Pasco Regional Medical Center, with Bayfront being the flagship hospital.  The deal closed in mid-2013, and Bayfront joined the HMA family of hospitals. Bayfront health was acquired by Community Health System in early 2014 along with other HMA facilities.

On October 1, 2020, Bayfront Health St. Petersburg was acquired by not-for-profit Orlando Health, after the St. Petersburg City Council approved the transaction in July 2020.

References

External links 
 Official website

Hospital buildings completed in 1906
Tuberculosis sanatoria in the United States
Teaching hospitals in Florida
Hospitals in Florida
Buildings and structures in St. Petersburg, Florida
Education in St. Petersburg, Florida
Community Health Systems
1906 establishments in Florida